Allocosa caboverdensis is a species of wolf spider of the family Lycosidae, endemic to Cape Verde.  The species was first described by Günter E. W. Schmidt and Rolf Harald Krause in 1995.  Its species name refers to Cape Verde, where it is found.

References

Further reading
Schmidt & Krause, 1995 : Weitere Spinnen von Cabo Verde. Entomologische Zeitschrift, Frankfurt am Main, vol. 105, no 18, p. 355-364.

Lycosidae
Spiders of Africa
Spiders described in 1995
Taxa named by Günter E. W. Schmidt
Taxa named by Rolf Harald Krause
Arthropods of Cape Verde
Endemic fauna of Cape Verde